Mebutamate (Capla, Dormate) is an anxiolytic and sedative drug with antihypertensive effects of the carbamate class. It has effects comparable to those of barbiturates such as secobarbital, but is only around 1/3 the potency of secobarbital as a sedative. Side effects include dizziness and headaches.

Mebutamate is one of many GABAergic drugs which act via allosteric agonism of the GABAA receptor at the β-subreceptor similar to barbiturates. In contrast, benzodiazepines act at the α-subreceptor. As such, carbamates and barbiturates, possess analgesic properties  while the benzodiazepine class of drugs are strictly psychoactive.

Other carbamates with the same mechanism of action and pharmacological properties include meprobamate, carisoprodol, felbamate, and tybamate.

Synthesis

Structural analogs
Lorbamate
Carisoprodol
Pentabamate
Mebutamate
Meprobamate
Felbamate
Tybamate

References 

Anxiolytics
Carbamates
GABAA receptor positive allosteric modulators